Neodymium(III) hydroxide is an insoluble inorganic compound with the chemical formula Nd(OH)3.

Production
Neodymium(III) nitrate and ammonia water will react to produce neodymium(III) hydroxide
 Nd(NO3)3 + 3 NH3·H2O → Nd(OH)3↓ + 3 NH4NO3
If the amount of Nd(NO3)3 is 40g/L, the amount of ammonia water needed is 0.50 mol/L. The ammonia water is mixed into the Nd(NO3)3 solution at the speed of 1.5mL/min, and polyethylene glycol is used to control pH. The process will produce neodymium(III) hydroxide powder with grain size ≤1μm.

Chemical properties

Neodymium(III) hydroxide can react with acid and produce neodymium salts:
 Nd(OH)3 + 3 H+ → Nd3+ + 3 H2O
For example, to create neodymium acetate with neodymium(III) hydroxide:
Nd(OH)3 + 3CH3COOH → Nd(CH3COO)3 + 3H2O

See also
 Neodymium
 Hydroxide
 Lanthanide

References

Neodymium compounds
Hydroxides